The cosmic neutrino background (CNB or CB) is the universe's background particle radiation composed of neutrinos. They are sometimes known as relic neutrinos.

The CB is a relic of the Big Bang; while the cosmic microwave background radiation (CMB) dates from when the universe was 379,000 years old, the CB decoupled (separated) from matter when the universe was just one second old.

As neutrinos rarely interact with matter, these neutrinos still exist today. They have a very low energy, around 10 to 10 eV. Even high energy neutrinos are notoriously difficult to detect, and the CB has energies around 1010 times smaller, so the CB may not be directly observed in detail for many years, if at all. However, Big Bang cosmology makes many predictions about the CB, and there is very strong indirect evidence that the CB exists.

Derivation of the CB temperature
Given the temperature of the cosmic microwave background (CMB) the temperature of the cosmic neutrino background (CB) can be estimated. It involves a change between two regimes:
Regime 1 The original state of the universe is a thermal equilibrium, the final stage of which has photons and leptons freely creating each other through annihilation (leptons create photons) and pair production (photons create leptons). This was the very brief state, right after the Big Bang. Its last stage involves only the lowest-mass possible fermions that interact with photons: electrons and positrons.

Regime 2 Once the universe has expanded enough that the photon+lepton plasma has cooled to the point that Big Bang photons no longer have enough energy for pair production of the lowest mass/energy leptons, the remaining electron–positron pairs annihilate. The photons they create are cool, and are then unable to create new particle pairs. This is the current state of most of the universe.

At very high temperatures, before neutrinos decoupled from the rest of matter, the universe primarily consisted of neutrinos, electrons, positrons, and photons, all in thermal equilibrium with each other.

Despite this decoupling, neutrinos and photons remained at the same temperature as the universe expanded as a "fossil" of the prior Regime 1, since both are cooled in the same way by the same process of cosmic expansion, from the same starting temperature. However, when the temperature dropped below double the mass of the electron, most electrons and positrons annihilated, transferring their heat and entropy to photons, thus increasing the temperature of the photons. So the ratio of the temperature of the photons before and after the electron–positron annihilation is the same as the ratio of the temperature of the neutrinos and the photons in the current Regime 2. To find this ratio, we assume that the entropy    of the universe was approximately conserved by the electron–positron annihilation. Then using

Once reactions cease, the entropy    should remain approximately "stuck" for all temperatures below the cut-off temperature, and we find that

Here  denotes the lowest temperature where pair production and annihilation were in equilibrium; and  denotes the temperature after the temperature fell below the regime-shift temperature , after the remaining, but no longer refreshed, electron–positron pairs had annihilated and contributed to the total photon energy.

The factor  is determined by a sum, based on the particle species engaged in the original equilibrium reaction:
 +   2   for each photon (or other massless bosons, if any).
 +      for each electron, positron, or other fermion.
Whereas the factor  is simply   2,   since the present regime only concerns photons, in thermal equilibrium with at most themselves.

So

Since the cosmic photon background temperature at present has cooled to  it follows that the neutrino background temperature is currently
 

The above discussion is technically valid for massless neutrinos, which are always relativistic. For neutrinos with a non-zero rest mass, at low temperature where the neutrinos become non-relativistic, a description in terms of a temperature is not appropriate. In other words, when the neutrinos' thermal energy  ( is the Boltzmann constant) falls below the rest mass energy  in a low-temperature case one should instead speak of the neutrinos' collective energy density, which remains both relevant and well-defined.

Indirect evidence for the CB 
Relativistic neutrinos contribute to the radiation energy density of the universe , typically parameterized in terms of the effective number of neutrino species :

where  denotes the redshift. The first term in the square brackets is due to the CMB, the second comes from the CB.

Big Bang nucleosynthesis 
Due to its effect on the expansion rate of the universe during Big Bang nucleosynthesis (BBN), the theoretical expectations for the primordial abundances of light elements depend on  Astrophysical measurements of the primordial  and  abundances lead to a value of  =  at 68% c.l., in very good agreement with the Standard Model expectation.

CMB anisotropies and structure formation 
The presence of the CB affects the evolution of CMB anisotropies as well as the growth of matter perturbations in two ways: Due to its contribution to the radiation density of the universe (which determines for instance the time of matter–radiation equality), and due to the neutrinos' anisotropic stress which dampens the acoustic oscillations of the spectra. Additionally, free-streaming massive neutrinos suppress the growth of structure on small scales. The WMAP spacecraft's five-year data combined with type Ia supernova data and information about the baryon acoustic oscillation scale yielded  =  at 68% c.l., providing an independent confirmation of the BBN constraints. The Planck spacecraft collaboration has published the tightest bound to date on the effective number of neutrino species, at  = .

Indirect evidence from phase changes to the Cosmic Microwave Background (CMB)
Big Bang cosmology makes many predictions about the CB, and there is very strong indirect evidence that the cosmic neutrino background exists, both from Big Bang nucleosynthesis predictions of the helium abundance, and from anisotropies in the cosmic microwave background. One of these predictions is that neutrinos will have left a subtle imprint on the cosmic microwave background (CMB). It is well known that the CMB has irregularities. Some of the CMB fluctuations were roughly regularly spaced, because of the effect of baryon acoustic oscillation. In theory, the decoupled neutrinos should have had a very slight effect on the phase of the various CMB fluctuations.

In 2015, it was reported that such shifts had been detected in the CMB. Moreover, the fluctuations corresponded to neutrinos of almost exactly the temperature predicted by Big Bang theory ( compared to a prediction of 1.95 K), and exactly three types of neutrino, the same number of neutrino flavours currently predicted by the Standard Model.

Prospects for the direct detection of the CB
Confirmation of the existence of these relic neutrinos may only be possible by directly detecting them using experiments on Earth. This will be difficult as the neutrinos which make up the CB are non-relativistic, in addition to interacting only weakly with normal matter, and so any effect they have in a detector will be hard to identify. One proposed method of direct detection of the CB is to use the capture of cosmic relic neutrinos on tritium i.e. 3H, leading to an induced form of beta decay.

The neutrinos of the CB would lead to the production of electrons via the reaction
 

while the main background comes from electrons produced via natural beta decay
 

These electrons would be detected by the experimental apparatus in order to measure the size of the CB. The latter source of electrons is far more numerous, however their maximum energy is smaller than the average energy of the CB-electrons by twice the average neutrino mass. Since this mass is tiny, of the order of a few eVs or less, such a detector must have an excellent energy resolution in order to separate the signal from the background. One such proposed experiment is called PTOLEMY, which will be made up of 100 g of tritium target. The detector should be ready by 2022.

See also

Cosmic background radiation
Dark matter
Diffuse supernova neutrino background
Gravitational wave background

Notes

References
  

Physical cosmology
Cosmic background radiation
Neutrino astronomy